Grandview Parkway is a  parkway in Traverse City, Michigan, serving as a bypass of downtown Traverse City. The roadway runs from just north of the Leelanau County line to an intersection at Front Street just east of downtown. It consists of US Highway 31 (US 31), M-22, M-37, and M-72. Also, the entirety of the highway is concurrent with the Lake Michigan Circle Tour. The highway is just north of the Boardman River and south of West Bay, meaning that many recreational sites are on either side of the parkway. It is known to be one of the main sites of the National Cherry Festival, which takes place every July.

Route description 

The parkway is maintained by the Michigan Department of Transportation. The highway is partially on the National Highway System; west of Division Street, the highway is not part of the system. However, the entire roadway is concurrent with the Lake Michigan Circle Tour, a tourist route that encircles Lake Michigan.

The highway starts at a five-way dog-leg intersection at Front Street, US 31/M-37/M-72, Franklin Street, and Railroad Street. The highway then splits and travels westward, passing by the former site of Wequetong, the original settlement of Traverse City. This is the beginning of the parkway running parallel to the TART Trail. The highway then crosses over the Boardman River at the New Murchie Bridge, implemented in 2017. After this bridge, there is a major interchange at Park Street, which leads directly into downtown Traverse City. The north side of the roadway then runs parallel to Clinch Park, a major park/beach in Traverse City. Another major interchange approaches, Union Street/Marina Drive, another major artery to Traverse City's Central Business District. This is also the entrance to the Duncan L. Clinch Marina, constructed in 1933. Next, the highway also passes along the Open Space, a public year-round park that was formerly the Traverse City Light and Power Plant, demolished in 2005.

Beyond Union Street, Grandview Parkway does not have any more busy intersections, while passing by more public beaches and volleyball courts. Finally, the highway reaches US 31/M-37 at Division Street, one of the busiest intersections in the county. This is where US 31/M-37 split off the concurrency, and M-22 begins. M-22 continues northward as Grandview Parkway for about  until the parkway ends.

History 

In 1953, a project was proposed to move traffic out of downtown Traverse City. It was to also to replace Bay Street and Front Street as the bayfront streets, as well as a former short street called "Barker Street" This project was greenlit, and in 1956, the parkway was opened to traffic. This highway ran alongside the Chesapeake and Ohio Railway in its entirety. In latter years, this railway was removed and replaced with the Leelanau Trail and TART Trail.

In 2017, the terminus of Garland Street in Traverse City was realigned from Grandview Parkway to Union Street, giving it a more "19th century look". This left Old Garland Street as a driveway to the headquarters of Traverse City's Tourism Bureau.

Also in 2017, the Murchie Bridge, which carries Grandview Parkway over the Boardman River, was replaced due to age.

Future 

There have been proposals to add roundabouts in many locations on Division Street, including its northern terminus at Grandview Parkway. Another roundabout has been proposed at the Union Street intersection, which is one of the busiest in Grand Traverse County.

References 

Transportation in Grand Traverse County, Michigan
Lake Michigan Circle Tour
U.S. Route 31